Jeff Pearce may refer to:

 Jeff Pearce (Canadian musician), bassist for the Canadian band Moist
 Jeff Pearce (American musician), ambient guitarist

See also
Jeff Pierce (disambiguation)